The Herndon Monument on the grounds of the U.S. Naval Academy is a  grey granite obelisk. It was erected in memory of Captain William Lewis Herndon, who died during the sinking of his ship, SS Central America, on September 12, 1857 while helping to evacuate passengers and crew. All women and children and many of the men aboard were saved by a nearby ship during the storm.

Description
The monument is a  granite obelisk presented to the Academy by the class of 1860. The sculptor is unknown.

Inscriptions

On the monument's base, facing the Naval Academy Chapel, is a plaque:

Maury is Matthew Fontaine Maury, Herndon's co-worker (from 1842 to 1846), brother-in-law, and cousin.

To the right on the obelisk from the plaque, in raised block letters, is "HERNDON.". On the opposite side of the obelisk, also in raised letters, is "September 12, 1857.".

Ship's bell

Central America′s ship's bell — discovered in her wreck in 1988 and donated to the Naval Academy as a gift in August 2021 — was positioned next to the monument and was dedicated in a ceremony on May 23, 2022.

Ceremony

The monument is the site of the famous "plebes-no-more" ceremony, where the plebes (first-year students at the academy) are all expected to work together to climb the greased monument and replace a plebe "dixie-cup hat" on top with a combination cover. This is the official end of the plebe year.

It is a Naval Academy tradition that the midshipman who replaces the dixie cup hat will be given the Superintendent's combination cover or shoulder boards. Legend says that he or she will be the first of his or her class to make Flag Rank, although in reality, this has not yet occurred.

The academy began recording times in 1959. In 1962 Midshipman 4th Class Ed Linz scaled the monument with the aid of a cargo net. Using such devices is now banned.

The record was set in 1969 when Midshipman Larry Fanning made the climb in 1 minute and 30 seconds. However, the monument was not greased.

Midshipman 4th Class Michael J. Maynard of the Class of 1975 scaled the monument in 20 minutes in 1972, believed to be the fastest time since the tradition of greasing the monument began.

Before the 2010 Herndon Monument climb, Superintendent Vice Admiral Jeffrey Fowler publicly indicated dissatisfaction that year with the risk of injury associated with the climbing tradition. Vice Adm. Fowler ordered the Brigade of Midshipmen not to slather the monument with lard "to improve the safety of the event". However, his successor, Vice Admiral Michael Miller, reinstated the tradition in 2011, citing that "[c]onducting the ceremonial climb in the same manner as so many previous classes helps to instill spirit and camaraderie among plebes and better links them to the many classes that have gone before them. The Herndon Monument climb serves as a useful event in reinforcing teamwork, organization and leadership."

Notes

References

http://www.navy.mil/search/display.asp?story_id=23729
http://www.public.usna91.info/TheCapitalVCIII%23141_19880521o.pdf
https://www.amazon.com/Herndon-Climb-Academys-Greatest-Tradition/dp/1682474380/ref=sr_1_9?dchild=1&keywords=the+climb+herndon&qid=1587500670&sr=8-9
https://www.usna.edu/PAO/faq_pages/herndon.php

External links

 YouTube video of plebes scaling Herndon

Monuments and memorials in Maryland
1860 sculptures
Herndon Monument
Obelisks in the United States